Jean-Marc Montera is a French guitarist, mainly active in the experimental music scene. Besides being active as a musician, he's also the director of the organisation GRIM, that organises concerts, festivals, workshops and artist in residence projects in Marseille.

Montera is active as a player since the 70s and has done collaborations with artists like Fred Frith, André Jaume, Barre Phillips, Yves Robert, Loren Mazzacane Connors, Thurston Moore, Lee Ranaldo, Louis Sclavis, Hifiklub, Michel Doneda. And in the theater, dance and visual art scenes with people like Sarah Kane, Biljana Srbljanović, Jean-Claude Berutti, Odile Duboc, Sandy Amerio. In 1978 he raised the organisation GRIM (Groupe de recherche et d'improvisation musicales, roughly translated: Group of Search and Musical Improvisation) of which is the director up until present time.

In 2001 he started an ensemble Treatise de Cornelius Cardew with Chris Cutler (ex-Henry Cow), Thomas Lehn and Hélène Breschand. In 2006 he performed in a guitar trio with Noël Akchoté and Jean-François Pauvros.

Discography (incomplete)
 Naxos (with Barre Phillips und Claudia Phillips), 1987
 Tavagna Group with André Jaume and Rémi Charmasson: Piazza di Luna, 1989
Unlike, 1990
 Paolo Daminani Ensemble: Song tong, 1991
HumaNoise congress, 1992
 Christine Wodrascka Quartet: Transkei, 1994
Hang Around Shout, 1995 (live);
 Gianni Gebbia, Miriam Palma, Vittorio Villa: Terra arsa, 1996
Improvvisazioni Quartetto (with Mike Cooper, Mauro Orselli and Eugenio Sanna), 1997
Smiles from Jupiter, Soloalbum, 1998
 King Übü Örchestrü: Trigger zone, 1998
MMMR, 1998 (with Lee Ranaldo, Thurston Moore, Loren Mazzacane Connors);
NOT, 1999 (with Érik M and Michel Doneda);
Smiles From Jupiter, 2000
Roman, 2004 (with Louis Sclavis);
 L'Hôtesse (with Sandy Amerio)

Other contributions
 Fred Frith and François-Michel Pesenti: Helter Skelter (1992)
 Fred Frith: Stone, Brick, Glass, Wood, Wire (1999)

Soundtrack for movie
2010 : Alter ego, film by Jérôme Nunes.

Sources and references
 bio on Allmusic

External links
 Website of GRIM

Year of birth missing (living people)
French experimental musicians
French guitarists
French male guitarists
Living people